Petra Schelm (16 August 1950 – 15 July 1971) was a German member of the Red Army Faction (RAF) far-left terrorist group. She was killed in a shootout with the police and was the first RAF member to die in a police operation, being shot in Hamburg when caught in a massive cordon and search operation in northern Germany in July, 1971.

Early years 

Schelm had completed her training as a hairdresser, because she had the desire to later work as a make-up artist. After her training, she worked for some time in a craft shop, after which she got a job as a guide with an American travel company. Then she lived in Berlin in a Commune and was involved in the so-called extra-parliamentary opposition, where she also met her boyfriend Manfred Grashof.

RAF involvement 
Schelm was active with Ulrike Meinhof and Horst Mahler in the working group on renting and living in the Märkisches district of Berlin, which was dedicated to the "re-socialization of marginalized social communities". However, the extent of her involvement in the working group is not clear. A former employee told Der Spiegel: "Actually, I would have had to know her, but I did not know her." In June 1970 she travelled via East Berlin to Jordan, where she, together with other RAF members, received military training in a Fatah camp. Due to various differences with the hosts, the Palestinian Fatah, the training was terminated prematurely. The group returned to Berlin in August 1970. In the spring of 1971, the German Federal Court of Justice (Bundesgerichtshof) issued a warrant for Petra Schelm and took her photo in a wanted poster. This was based on the suspicion that her acquaintance with Ulrike Meinhof and her environment could have developed into participation in a criminal organization.
At the time of her death, Petra Schelm had not had any contact with her parents for a long time. She had introduced Manfred Grashof to her parents, who asked her father for his daughter's hand in marriage. When he refused to agree, their relationship was broken off.

Death

On 15 July 1971 Schelm was driving through Hamburg with Werner Hoppe when she sped her BMW, a stolen BMW, through a police roadblock. The police gave chase and forced her BMW off the road. Schelm and Hoppe ran off in different directions. Hoppe was followed by a police helicopter and was caught and arrested, but Schelm did not surrender. She threw away a jacket she was holding to reveal a handgun and fired at the police, but the police returned fire. Jillian Becker states that Schelm was killed by a burst of gunfire from a submachine gun, but Stefan Aust states that it was a single bullet wound to the head that killed Schelm. Additionally, a closeup photograph of Schelm taken at the scene immediately after her death (probably by a police photographer) clearly shows a single gunshot wound through the eye. Some RAF members called for retribution for Schelm's death. She was buried at a cemetery in Spandau. At her funeral, fifty or so youths laid a red flag on her grave, though policemen later came and removed it.

References

Sources 
 

1950 births
1971 deaths
People from Hamburg
Members of the Red Army Faction